Omar Franklin Morales (born 20 December 1985) is a footballer who plays as a striker for St. Maartener club United Super Stars FC and the Saint Martin national team.

Born in the Dominican Republic, Morales plays internationally for the Collectivity of Saint Martin.

Career
Morales played for the Orléans Attackers. He made his international debut for Saint Martin national football team in 2010.

References

External links

1985 births
Living people
People from La Romana, Dominican Republic
Dominican Republic emigrants to France
Naturalized citizens of France
Association football forwards
Orléans Attackers players
Saint Martin international footballers
Dominican Republic expatriate footballers
French expatriate footballers
French expatriate sportspeople in the Netherlands
Dominican Republic expatriate sportspeople in the Netherlands